Aphrogeneia ("foam-sprung") may refer to:

Aphrogeneia, an ephitet of the goddess Aphrodite
Aphrogeneia, a synonym for the moth genus Idaea